James Chatterton (1 April 1836 – 13 February 1891) was an English first-class cricketer active 1856–67 who played for Nottinghamshire. He was born and; died in Newark, Nottinghamshire.

References

1836 births
1891 deaths
English cricketers
Nottinghamshire cricketers
North v South cricketers
Marylebone Cricket Club cricketers
Professionals of Marylebone Cricket Club cricketers
Players cricketers
North of the Thames v South of the Thames cricketers
United All-England Eleven cricketers